Dragon's Breath is a chili pepper cultivar that unofficially tested at 2.48 million Scoville units.

Development
The plant was developed in a collaboration between chili farmer Neal Price, NPK Technology, and Nottingham Trent University during a test of a special plant food and for its essential oil having potential as a skin anesthetic. The Dragon's Breath plant was later cultivated by breeder Mike Smith of St Asaph, Denbighshire, Wales, who said that he had not planned to breed the chili for record heat, but rather was trying to grow an attractive pepper plant. Due to the nationality of the farmer who cultivated the pepper in Wales, it was named Dragon's Breath after the Welsh dragon. It was entered in the Plant of the Year contest at the 2017 Chelsea Flower Show where it was on the short list, but did not place.

Heat
The Dragon's Breath chili was unofficially tested at 2.48 million Scoville units making it a contender for the hottest chili pepper in the world. Guinness World Records has so far not recognized this claim, as the Carolina Reaper is still mentioned as the current record holder. It was allegedly surpassed several months later by Pepper X at 3.18 million Scoville units, but this is also unconfirmed.

Nottingham Trent University researchers suggest that the pepper's ability to numb the skin could make its essential oil useful as an anaesthetic for patients who cannot tolerate other anaesthetics, or in countries where they are too expensive. Experts at the university warned that swallowing one might cause death by choking or anaphylactic shock; one science writer noted that this was a standard warning that applied only to those with relevant allergies.

See also
 List of Capsicum cultivars
 Hottest chili pepper

References

Chili peppers
Capsicum cultivars
Crops originating from Europe